Australian People for Health, Education and Development Abroad (APHEDA), also known as Union Aid Abroad, is a non-government organisation of the Australian union movement. The non-government organisation was established in 1984 as the international aid agency of the Australian Council of Trade Unions. APHEDA was initiated in the pursuit of global justice through “stronger union and social movements, sustainable development programs, global solidarity and support in times of crisis”  in Southeast Asia, the Pacific, the Middle East, South Africa and the Caribbean. APHEDA is also a registered charity with the Australian Charities and Not for Profits Commission.

There are four key areas in which the APHEDA organisation intends to focus on, these are dignity at work, social justice, economic equality and the realisation of human rights.

History 

The Palestinian insurgency in South Lebanon prevailed in the 1970s and 1980s. During this time, it is said significant tensions arose between Palestinian civilians and Israeli officials due to acts said to be "synonymous with terrorism" carried out by the Palestine Liberation Organisation (PLO). In 1982, the Israeli government commenced Operation Peace for Galilee said to be in retaliation against the PLO who was accused of attempting to assassinate the then prime minister, Menachem Begin. Operation Peace for Galilee then invaded Lebanon, which is said to have been the spark for the commencement of the 1982 Lebanon War. This war was stated to be the "longest Arab-Israeli war" and one of which reeked military havoc on "heavily population civilian areas". During this period, many civilians were killed, injured or forced to seek refuge elsewhere.

During this conflict, Helen McCue, a nurse practitioner originating from Australia, was employed in the Middle East as a nurse for the World Health Organization. Helen stated she was horrified by the crime and unintended harm to civilians which took place due to the Lebanese civil war, after the Sabra-Shatila massacre. Therefore, in 1982 she resigned from the World Health Organization to volunteer in Beirut refugee camps for the Palestinian Red Crescent.

In this volunteer position, McCue witnessed, in her words, "the deterioration of the physical, psychological, social and cultural well-being of four million Palestinians". McCue stated witness of this whilst working with the Palestinian Red Crescent was the inspiration to "broaden the base of support Palestinians and to somehow set up an organisation, based in union movement". Within Beirut refugee camps, McCue volunteered for the Palestine Red Crescent Society, a humanitarian organisation which act in the interest of the "health and welfare of the Palestinian people".

In 1983, McCue proposed the idea of a trade union-based international humanitarian organisation to Cliff Dolan, the leader of the Australian Council of Trade Unions (ACTU) at the time. This was supported and in 1984, the organisation to later be known as the Union Aid Abroad – Australian People for Health, Education and Development Abroad received its first two government grants for "humanitarian development assistance" to support overseas health workers.

At this point, the Australian Council of Trade Unions had officially contracted APHEDA as their international aid agency.

Key contributors

Helen McCue 
Helen McCue was an Australian, Catholic nurse who grew up in Canberra, Australia. In the early 1980s, McCue worked for the World Health Organization as a United Nations consultant to evaluate nursing services in the Middle East. McCue then transitioned into a role at the United Nations Relief and Workers for the Agency of Palestinians. It is here McCue worked in Bekker Valley with the refugee community. After the Sabra-Shatila massacre, McCue felt as if she had "failed to protect"  the refugee community in her role at the United Nations. Consequently, McCue left the organisation to volunteer in refugee camps. This inspired her to approach Cliff Dolan. McCue's intention for the development of APHEDA was to develop a network where various skilled workers with technical and vocational skills in the Australian community could “support the training of people in these refugee situations”. After founding APHEDA with Cliff Dolan in 1984, McCue was named the executive director. McCue set up several training programs in Australia for nurses abroad to develop critical nursing skills. This led to the establishment of a nurse training program in Lebanon. Further responsibilities of McCue in her time as executive director included “setting up infrastructure in Australia”, recruiting the alliance of international unions and was a key player in overseas project work, in Vietnam, the Philippines, South Africa and the Middle East.

Audrey McDonald 
Audrey McDonald was a second key contributor to the APHEDA organisation in its early days. McDonald was born in Sandy Flat and relocated with her mother to the Sydney city. At 17 years old, McDonald represented APHEDA at the 1955 Congress of the Food & Canning Workers Organisation in Sofia, Bulgaria. McDonald is said to have supported the APHEDA organisation on an ongoing basis directly and through her affiliations with the Union of Australian Women at which she was the national secretary. McDonald authored a novel with her husband Tom McDonald detailing their experiences in union aid. The funds of this novel contribute to funding a child South African nutrition project directed by APHEDA.

Goals and objectives 
The APHEDA organisation state their purpose is driven towards the achievement of four main areas:

 Dignity at work
 Social justice
 Economic equality
 The realisation of human rights

The organisation plans to achieve this via unions, social movements, sustainable development programs, global solidarity and crisis support.

The APHEDA organisation have identified five key values in which they endeavour to operate in line with. These values refer to solidarity, equality and justice, movement-building, accountability and partnership.

Funding 
APHEDA is registered with the Australian Charities and Not-for-profits Commission. The organisation derives their funding from "government funding, other grants, donations, fundraising and interest income". The Australian Department of Foreign Affairs and Trade funds several of Union-Aid-APHEDA's projects offshore. Members can pay a minimum membership fee of $15.00 a month which is also contributed to the funding of Union-Aid APHEDA's offshore projects and programs. As a registered "Australian Company Limited by Guarantee", the organisation must reinvest any profits obtained back into the charity's work.

Structure 
The governing board of APHEDA are elected by their members and the ACTU.

Volunteers of the organisation will provide unpaid services for Australian community education and/or assistance on overseas projects. In 2019–2020 financial year, volunteers devoted 330 hours to the organisation's work in community education and 3167 hours towards work on overseas projects.
Employees of APHEDA work under the Union-Aid Abroad-APHEDA Staff Agreement 2018–2019. This single enterprise agreement operates under section 185 of Fair Work Act 2009 (the Act). Volunteers are not considered under this agreement.

Partnerships 
APHEDA has 45 partner organisations in 14 different countries. It is proposed there are four main categories of partnership in which APHEDA engage in, they refer to:

 Standards and guidelines development        
 Project Funding
 Provision of services and personnel
 Provision of goods

Criticisms and controversies 
The rise of independence movements in Indonesia occurred in 1976–2005.

In 2002, the acting prime minister John Howard's visit to Indonesia was not well received by the government officials. Government officials cancelled scheduled meetings with Howard as it was believed Australia was in support of the West Papua and Aceh independence movements. Howard claimed Australia was not in support of the political tensions in the region. However, the controversies had arisen due to Australian Aid monetary contributions towards APHEDA. At the time, APHEDA were said to be utilising funding to establish Indonesian trade union training programs. Through this, it is said APHEDA were partially responsible for the strike which occurred against the Shangri-La Hotel chain at the end of 2000 for the hotel-chain workers right to freedom of association. The strike required police interference and had several legal implications for strikers. Fines were issued to the unions and staff involved lost their job.

The above behaviour was not considered by Indonesian political powers to be in line with the expectations of an Australian non-government organisation, this therefore is said to be the reason many criticisms were upheld against the organisation by some.

In the 2018-19 Australian federal budget,  was assigned towards development aid to assist in Palestinian territories under the Australian Middle East NGO Cooperation Agreement (AMENCA 3). Union Aid Abroad-APHEDA was one of four recipients of this funding. It was suggested the use of this funding was controversial. This controversy came from APHEDA's use of funds to assist the MA’AN Development Centre, specifically to repair water points, wells, water tanks and pipelines in the area. The MA’AN Development Centre is located in Ramallah, their mission is to “partner and work with Palestinian NGOs and groups in the community... guided by community participation, a human rights base approach…and empowerment of the poor…”. The controversy arose due to material published by the MA’AN Development Centre which was critical of Israel. The criticisms referred to accusations of war crimes and promotion of the idea Israel profits from the destruction of Gaza. Due to APHEDA's “close affiliation” with Australian political parties, this was considered controversial by some.

Conflicts also arose in May 2002. The Fact Finding Mission to the Occupied Palestinian Territories report was released by APHEDA, it was proposed this report did not reflect the neutral standpoint which is required for taxpayer-funded projects.

In April 2020, APHEDA in partnership with the Samoa First Union (SFU) conducted an inquiry into Australia's relationship with countries in the Pacific Islands region. This inquiry investigated two components of Australian Liberal Government's Stepping Up the Pacific Scheme which was commenced by Scott Morrison in November 2018 in Pacific Island countries. These two components were the Pacific Labour Scheme and Seasonal Worker Programme. APHEDA's inquiry proposed there are distinct cultural shortcomings in the Australian government's pre-departure training and employment law for seasonal workers. The unintended impact such programs are said to have upon the Pacific Island culture, e.g. the separation of families and social and cultural isolation was also addressed. It was proposed by APHEDA and SFU that the initiatives of the Australian Government are beneficial, but for the health and wellbeing of Pacific Islander people in Australian countries, the suggested current cultural shortcomings are addressed.

Political advocacies 
APHEDA's political advocacies are centred around eight key areas: global issues, anti-corruption, illicit drug and law enforcement, disasters and humanitarian affairs, gender issues, HIV/AIDS, tuberculosis, health and medical, peace and security, and labour conditions.

Gender equality 
APHEDA work in partnership with Irish Aid. The two AID organisations have been responsible for the training of women in positions of leadership in Vietnam, across several districts, communes and provinces.

The intention of this project is to empower more women to engage in political agendas and positions of political leadership and further, for these women to advocate for gender-related concerns to ensure policies are developed and implemented include the voice of all.

This project began in October 2017 and was set to continue until August 2021.

Mae Tao Clinic 

The Mae Tao Clinic was founded by Dr. Cynthia Maung in 1988. The organisation provides health care free of charge to assist migrants and refugees crossing the border from Burma and Thailand. APHEDA continues to support this organisation offshore from Australia and in the clinic.

Capacity building for Karen Women at the Thai-Myanmar Border 
In this program, APHEDA work in partnership with the Karen's Women's Organisation (KWO) in refugee camps along the Thai-Myanmar border. The program intends to strengthen leadership skills and knowledge within the camps to ensure community services can continue to be actioned despite political instability in the region. In 2020, this program received  in DFAT funding.

Campaign to ban asbestos in South-East Asia 
This campaign is active in several areas of South-East Asia. These areas are Indonesia, Laos, Vietnam and Cambodia. It involves Australian APHEDA volunteers working with unionists and campaigners in an attempt to “ban asbestos and eliminate asbestos-related diseases”. The overall goal for this campaign is to do so to eliminate asbestos-related diseases in these regions. In 2020, the campaign pushed to reform the Rotterdam Convention. To do so, the Australian Council of Trade Unions and Union-Aid APHEDA initiated an alliance between international several trade unions and environmental non-governmental organisations. It was forecasted in the 2000-2007 period, Asia was responsible for 64% share of the global asbestos use.

Boosting agriculture in Gaza and the West Bank 

This APHEDA project began in 2015 in association with the MA’AN Development Centre, The Palestinian Business Women's Association – Asala and the Institute for Community Partnership of Bethlehem University.

The project has had several intentions:

 Enhance long-term profitability of small-scale farmers and producers
 Avoid toxic pesticides and improve standards
 Lower costs and reduce waste through water tanks and new agricultural roads
 Improve gender equality in farm production industries

The project has been funded by the Australia Middle East NGO Cooperation Agreement Phase 3.

Recognition from Nelson Mandela 
In 2010, after Nelson Mandela’s release from prison he made tribute to the work of the APHEDA organisation. Specifically, the contribution and support APHEDA demonstrated for the anti-apartheid struggle.

References

External links 
 

1984 establishments in Australia
Political organisations based in Australia